This is a list of defunct airlines of Sweden.

See also

 List of airlines of Sweden
 List of airports in Sweden

References

 
Sweden
Sweden transport-related lists
Airlines